STARadio is a radio broadcast company that owns several radio stations throughout the United States in the cities of Quincy and Kankakee, IL as well as stations in Great Falls, Montana.

Radio stations
KGRC
KINX
KZZK
WCOY
WKAN
WQCY
WTAD
WYKT

References

Quincy–Hannibal area
Radio broadcasting companies of the United States
Companies based in Adams County, Illinois